Dina Nayeri (born 1979) is an Iranian-American novelist, essayist, and short story writer. She wrote the novels A Teaspoon of Earth and Sea (2014) and Refuge (2017) and the creative nonfiction book The Ungrateful Refugee (2019)

Early life and education 
Nayeri was born in Isfahan, Iran. Her mother was a doctor and her father a dentist. She spent the first 8 years of her life in Isfahan but fled Iran with her mother and brother Daniel in 1988 because her mother had converted to Christianity and the moral police of the Islamic Republic had threatened her with execution. Nayeri, her mother and brother spent two years in Dubai and Rome as asylum seekers and eventually settled in Oklahoma, in the United States. Her father remained in Iran, where he still lives.

Nayeri holds a Bachelor of Arts from Princeton University and a Master of Education and MBA from Harvard University. She also holds an MFA from the Iowa Writers’ Workshop.

Work 
Nayeri's first novel, A Teaspoon of Earth and Sea, was published in 2014 by Riverhead Books (Penguin) and translated into 14 languages.

Refuge 
Her second novel, Refuge, was published in 2017, also by Riverhead Books. Refuge is a semi-autobiographical novel whose chapters are written alternately from the point of view of Niloo Hamidi, an Iranian woman who emigrated to the United States and, at the time of the novel, is teaching anthropology at a university in Amsterdam, and Bahman Hamidi, her father, a dentist and oral surgeon living in Isfahan, Iran. Niloo's chapters relating her current life in the Netherlands are in the third person, as are Bahman's chapters, while flashback chapters about Niloo's four visits with her father in four different cities are narrated in the first person by Niloo.

The novel is partly about a father-daughter relationship and partly about the refugee crisis that is affecting all of Europe, with particular focus on the Iranian refugee community in Netherlands.

When Niloo was forced to leave Iran with her mother and brothers, her father stayed behind. Niloo, who had a deep and joyous bond with her baba, was shocked by this and expected that he would join then. Bahman, however, went on to remarry, first a peasant woman with a young daughter, then, after divorcing her, a young and attractive woman. The novel starts with Bahman waiting for an audience with a divorce judge, a cleric, to obtain a divorce from his third wife. Bahman's third divorce constitutes the plot line of the chapters about present-day Bahman.

As attested by a personal essay published in The New Yorker, many of Niloo's circumstances and adventures, including the four visits with her father, are modeled closely on real events in the author's life. Unlike the author's real-life brother, Niloo's brother Kian is a chef (the New Yorker article indicates that the author's real-life brother is a businessman) and is not married. There is no mention of his having a romantic interest.

Personal life 
Upon reaching the United States Nayeri lived as a refugee, "in refugee hostels," for a number of years. When she was 15, in 1994, she became an American citizen, alongside her mother and brother. In 2001 she graduated from Princeton. In 2003 she married Philip Viergutz, a French citizen. She worked in New York City as a strategy consultant at McKinsey & Company and later as a strategic manager at Saks Fifth Avenue. She lived for some years in Amsterdam with her husband.

She had been living in London since 2015, but now lives in Scotland. She has a daughter and is divorced from her husband.

List of works

Novels and books
 A Teaspoon of Earth and Sea (2013) 
 Refuge (2017) 
The Ungrateful Refugee (2019)
The Waiting Place (2020)

Articles
 "The Ungrateful Refugee: 'We Have No Debt to Repay'". The Guardian, April 2017
 "My Father, in Four Visits over Thirty Years". The New Yorker, June 2017

Awards and honors 
 2013 Barnes & Noble Discover Great New Writers Program: A Teaspoon of Earth and Sea
 2015 O. Henry Prize: "A Ride out of Phrao" Alaska Quarterly Review, vol. 30, 2013 
 2016 National Endowment for the Arts Creative Writing Fellowship
 2017 Finalist, American Academy in Rome Prize
 2017 Longlist for The Morning News' Tournament of Books: Refuge
 2018 Best American Short Stories for "A Big True" The Southern Review 
 2018 Winner, UNESCO City of Literature Paul Engle Prize 
2019 Columbia Institute for Ideas and Imagination Fellow 
2019 Finalist, Kirkus Prize, The Ungrateful Refugee
2019 Finalist, Los Angeles Times Book Prize, The Ungrateful Refugee 
2020 Finalist, Elle Prix des Lectrices (France), The Ungrateful Refugee
 2020 Winner, Geschwister Scholl-Preis (Germany), The Ungrateful Refugee
2020 Winner, Clara Johnson Prize, The Ungrateful Refugee

References

External links 
 Official website
 @DinaNayeri at Twitter
 Dina Nayeri at Facebook

1979 births
Living people
Iranian emigrants to the United States
Harvard Business School alumni
Princeton University alumni
McKinsey & Company people
American writers of Iranian descent
21st-century American novelists
Harvard Graduate School of Education alumni
21st-century American women writers
O. Henry Award winners